Richard Hogan (born 8 August 1988) is an Irish hurler who plays as a midfielder at senior level for the Kilkenny county team.

Born in Waterford in 1988, Hogan is a native of Danesfort, County Kilkenny. Hogan first played competitive hurling during his schooling at St Kieran's College. He arrived on the inter-county scene at the age of fifteen when he first linked up with the Kilkenny minor team, before later joining the under-21 side. He joined the senior panel during the 2007 championship. Hogan soon became a regular member of the starting fifteen and has won seven All-Ireland medals, seven Leinster medals and four National Hurling League medals. He has been an All-Ireland runner-up on two occasions.

As a member of the Leinster inter-provincial team, Hogan has won one Railway Cup medal. At club level he is an All-Ireland and Leinster medallist at junior level with Danesfort. In addition to these he has also won several championship medals in different grades.

Hogan's brother Paddy was also a member of the Kilkenny senior team and won All Ireland Medals in 2011 and 2012 while his close relation D. J. Carey is regarded as one of the all-time greats of the game.

Playing career

Club
Hogan plays his club hurling with the Danesfort club.

In 2006 he won a junior county championship title when Danesfort defeated Tullogher-Rosbercon in the final.  It was the club's first county title in that grade since 1930. Danesfort later defeated Knockbridge to claim the Leinster junior club title. Hogan later captured an All-Ireland junior club title following a 2–16 to 2–8 defeat of Clooney Gaels. Hogan was the top scorer in the final scoring 1–6, while he also received a place on the Kilkenny club all-star team of the year at right-corner forward.

Danesfort reached the Intermediate league final 3 years in a row (2009,2010 and 2011) in which they were beaten by Rower Inistiogue (09 and 11) and Mullinvat in 2010. Hogan captained Danesfort to the County Intermediate final a 2nd time in 2011. This time they were successful beating Rower Inistiogue in the final. Early goals from Hogan and Robbie Walsh set Danesfort on their way along with good performances from Kilkenny players Paddy Hogan and Paul Murphy. This was the clubs first Intermediate title since 1931.

Minor and under-21
Hogan first came to prominence on the inter-county scene as a member of the Kilkenny minor team in 2004. He won his first Leinster medal that year following a heavy 1–15 to 1–4 defeat of Dublin. The subsequent All-Ireland decider pitted Kilkenny against Galway. Hogan proved to be the hero for Kilkenny, as his point, a minute into injury time, earned "the Cats" a 1–18 to 3–12 draw. The replay a week later was also a close affair, with Galway just about holding off the Kilkenny challenge to win by 0–16 to 1–12.

After surrendering their provincial title in 2005, Kilkenny bounced back the following year. A 4–22 to 1–5 defeat of Carlow gave Hogan a second Leinster medal.

Hogan's performances at minor level saw him being added to the under-21 panel for the All-Ireland decider against Tipperary in 2006. A last second opportunist goal by Hogan saved Kilkenny and secured a 2–14 apiece draw. The replay was another close encounter, however, Paddy Hogan's first half goal helped Kilkenny claw their way to the title following a 1–11 to 0–11 defeat of Tipperary. It was Hogan's first All-Ireland medal.

After surrendering their provincial and All-Ireland crowns the following year, Hogan collected his first Leinster medal in 2008 following a facile 2–21 to 2–9 defeat of Offaly. Old rivals Tipperary provided the opposition in the All-Ireland decider. Tipp whittled down a six-point half-time deficit to just two with minutes to go, however, Kilkenny hung on to win by 2–13 to 0–15 and secure the Grand Slam of championship titles.

Hogan collected a second successive Leinster medal in 2009, as a brace of Jonjo Farrell goals helped Kilkenny to a 2–20 to 1–19 defeat of Dublin. Clare later faced Kilkenny in their first ever All-Ireland decider. A late point from midfielder Cormac O'Donovan gave Clare a narrow 0–15 to 0–14 victory.

Senior

Beginnings
Hogan was just out of the minor grade when he was added to the Kilkenny senior panel in 2007.  That year he shared in his county's Leinster and All-Ireland triumphs, however, Hogan was yet to make his debut.

On 15 June 2008 Hogan made his senior championship debut in a 2–24 to 0–12 Leinster semi-final defeat of Offaly. It proved to be his only championship outing that year, however, he collected another set of Leinster and All-Ireland medals as a non-playing substitute.

Hogan collected a first National League medal in 2009, as Kilkenny beat Tipperary by 2–26 to 4–17 with a thrilling extra-time victory. He finished the game with 1–10 and the man of the match accolade, however, injury hampered him for the subsequent championship campaign. Hogan's only start that year came on 6 September as Kilkenny faced Tipperary in the All-Ireland decider. For long periods Tipp looked the likely winners, however, late goals from Henry Shefflin and substitute Martin Comerford finally killed off their efforts to secure a 2–22 to 0–23 victory. Hogan, who was substituted after suffering an ankle injury, had collected his first All-Ireland medal on the field of play.

Established player

In 2010 Kilkenny defeated Galway in an eagerly-anticipated but ultimately disappointing provincial decider. A 1–19 to 1–12 victory gave Hogan a 3rd Leinster medal. The drive for a fifth successive All-Ireland crown reached a head on 5 September 2010, when Kilkenny faced Tipperary in the All-Ireland decider. "The Cats" lost talisman Henry Shefflin due to injury, while Tipperary's Lar Corbett ran riot and scored a hat-trick of goals as Hogan's side fell to a 4–17 to 1–18 defeat.

Kilkenny's stranglehold in Leinster continued in 2011. A 4–17 to 1–15 defeat of Dublin gave "the Cats" a record-equalling seventh successive championship. It was Hogan's fourth winners. Kilkenny subsequently faced Tipperary in the All-Ireland decider on 4 September 2011. Goals by Michael Fennelly and Hogan in either half gave Kilkenny, who many viewed as the underdogs going into the game, a 2–17 to 1–16 victory. Hogan collected a second All-Ireland medal before later picking up his first All-Star.

Hogan received two broken ribs and a punctured lung in an accidental clash with Galway goalkeeper Jamie Ryan in the final round of the 2012 league. While a two-month absence was expected, Hogan recovered in time for the final. A 3–21 to 0–16 demolition of old rivals Cork gave him a second league medal. Kilkenny were later shocked by Galway in the Leinster decider, losing by 2–21 to 2–11, however, both sides subsequently met in the All-Ireland decider on 9 September 2012. Kilkenny had led going into the final stretch, however, Joe Canning struck a stoppage time equaliser to level the game at 2–13 to 0–19 and send the final to a replay for the first time since 1959. The replay took place three weeks later on 30 September 2012. Galway stunned the reigning champions with two first-half goals, however, Kilkenny's championship debutant Walter Walsh gave a man of the match performance, claiming a 1–3 haul. The 3–22 to 3–11 Kilkenny victory gave Hogan a 5th All-Ireland medal.

Kilkenny's dominance showed no sign of abating in 2013, with Hogan winning a third league medal following a 2–17 to 0–20 defeat of Tipperary in the decider.

Continued dominance
In 2014 Hogan collected his fourth league medal, as Kilkenny secured a narrow one-point 2–25 to 1–27 extra-time victory over Tipperary. Hogan subsequently secured a fifth Leinster medal, as a dominant Kilkenny display gave "the Cats" a 0–14 to 1–9 defeat of Dublin. On 7 September 2014, Kilkenny lined out in an All-Ireland decider with Tipperary. In what some consider to be the greatest game of all-time, the sides were level when Tipperary were awarded a controversial free. John O'Dwyer had the chance to win the game, however, his late free drifted wide resulting in a draw. Hogan's display in that drawn game earned him the man of the match award. The replay on 27 September 2014 was also a close affair. Goals from brothers Richie and John Power inspired Kilkenny to a 2–17 to 2–14 victory. It was Hogan's sixth All-Ireland medal. He later picked up a second All-Star, while he was also named Hurler of the Year. 

In the 2019 All-Ireland hurling final Hogan was sent off after 32 minutes following a challenge on Tipperary's Cathal Barrett.

Inter-provincial
Hogan made his debut in the Inter Provincial Championships against Connacht in 2008 scoring 9points. He later scored the decisive goal to defeat Munster in the final claiming his first Inter Provincial medal. He won a second medal in 2012 as Leinster defeated Connacht in Nowlan Park.
In 2014 Hogan was at midfield on the Leinster inter-provincial team. Just 150 spectators turned up to Croke Park as Leinster defeated Connacht for the third time in four finals by 1–23 to 0–16.

Career statistics

Honours

Player
Danesfort
 All-Ireland Junior Club Hurling Championship  2007
 Leinster Junior Club Hurling Championship: 2007
 Kilkenny Intermediate Hurling Championship: 2011 (c)
 Kilkenny Junior Hurling Championship: 2006

Kilkenny
All-Ireland Senior Hurling Championship: 2007, 2008, 2009, 2011, 2012, 2014, 2015
Leinster Senior Hurling Championship: 2007, 2008, 2009, 2010, 2011, 2014, 2015, 2016, 2020, 2021
National Hurling League: 2009, 2012, 2013, 2014, 2021
Walsh Cup: 2009, 2012, 2014, 2017
All-Ireland Under-21 Hurling Championship: 2006, 2008
Leinster Under-21 Hurling Championship: 2006, 2008, 2009
Leinster Minor Hurling Championship:  2004, 2006

Individual
Awards
 GAA-GPA All-Star Award (4): 2011, 2014, 2015, 2016
 The Sunday Game Player of the Year (1): 2014
 GAA-GPA Hurler of the Year (1): 2014

References

1988 births
Living people
All-Ireland Senior Hurling Championship winners
Danesfort hurlers
Kilkenny inter-county hurlers
Leinster inter-provincial hurlers